Donald Whitney Thompson (August 18, 1937 – July 17, 2019) was a film director, producer and screenwriter of Christian films. He was best known for the evangelical Christian film series A Thief in the Night about the Rapture and Tribulation.

Life and career 
Thompson was born in Hornell, New York. He graduated from Hamburg Central High School in 1956.

Upon graduating high school, Thompson joined the Air Force where he served as a motion picture editorial specialist, director and producer. He moved to Des Moines in 1967 to write a series of movies for General Motors. In 1968, he married his wife, Beverly.

In the 1972, Thompson partnered with Russell Doughten to form the Christian film company Mark IV Pictures. Thompson wrote and directed 12 feature-length motion pictures, including the prophecy series that began with A Thief in the Night.  According to Heather Hendershot, professor of film and media at MIT,

After twelve years and twelve pictures together, a disagreement over management and distribution forced Thompson out of Mark IV in 1984.  Doughten retained Mark IV Pictures, while Thompson signed on with American Media in Des Moines.

The Christian and secular film industries alike have praised Thompson's work. Harry Bristow of the Christian Film Distributors Association calls him "the finest director in the industry."

Thompson also spent time as a radio disk jockey at KRNT in Des Moines, and did a Christian radio broadcast on KWKY in Des Moines.

He died in 2019 in Iowa.

Filmography

References

External links

The Films of Donald W. Thompson

1937 births
2019 deaths
People from Hornell, New York
Film directors from New York (state)
Military personnel from New York (state)